Chhayanat ("shadow or glimpse of Nat") is a raga in Hindustani classical music. It is a relative of Nat, an old raga that is rarely performed.

Technical description 
Chhayanat is a very popular raag whereas its constituent "Chhaya" and "Nat" are rarely sung anymore. Its distinctive phrases P->R and P->S'  set it apart from the related Kamod, Kedar, Alhaiya Bilawal and Hameer.

Samay 
Chhayanat is an evening raag, and is sung during the second "prahar" 9PM-12AM.

References

Hindustani ragas